Backwell School is a secondary academy school in Backwell, Bristol, Somerset, England. It was considered to be one of the best-performing state schools in England, leading results at both GCSE and A level in the area and consistently being rated "Outstanding" by Ofsted. It has now been rated "Good" by Ofsted.

The school is a National Teaching School, through which it leads the North Somerset Teaching Alliance, with Healthy School Plus and International School status. Since March 2011 the school has been a self-governing academy convert. It holds the Artsmark Gold award and includes a sixth form.

It has 1,738 pupils, of which 387 were in the school's sixth form in 2016, from the age of 11 (year 7) to the age of 18 (year 13). Backwell has previously been a Beacon School, specialist performing and visual arts college and National Training School.

History

The original secondary modern school at Backwell was founded by Somerset County Council in 1954 and later became a comprehensive school in 1976 when the tripartite education system was abolished in the area. The school's original building dates from 1954, when Britain was in the midst of a post-war school-building boom.

The first Headmaster of The School, Mr W. C. M. Cox was in the 1946 New Year Honours (Mentioned in Dispatches) he was Flight Lieutenant W. C. M. Cox (133777), RAFVR.

In 2009, 71% of GCSE pupils achieved at least five GCSE passes above grade C including English and Maths. This is 21% above the national average that year. It is the highest performing state secondary school in North Somerset.

In November 2008, Backwell School was rated as outstanding by Ofsted. It was inspected again in May 2013 (no. 413323) due to the school having converted to an academy two years previous. It was judged to be outstanding in all categories.

On 11 September 2015 a small fire broke out in the Cotswold house building, causing minor damage to the block. All staff and pupils were safely evacuated.

Catchment area

The school's catchment area includes the villages of Backwell, Yatton, Claverham, Cleeve and Kingston Seymour, although several hundred of the school's pupils come from locations outside of its official catchment area from locations such as Nailsea and Bristol. Admissions are managed by the local education authority – North Somerset Council.

School site

The site at Backwell is relatively large, featuring multiple large sports grounds to the North. Buildings vary extremely in design and age with the oldest part of the original school, known as 'Lower School' and the 'Science Corridor', which includes the main theatre, dating back to 1954 – being the same design as at Kingsmead School while the Sixth Form Centre was completed in just 2011.

Backwell Leisure Centre is no longer part of the school grounds, but is situated directly next to the rear entrance of the school, and is used for swimming in PE lessons.

Extracurricular activities

Backwell is known for its strong association with the performing arts, having previously been a specialist performing arts college. Its bi-yearly whole school productions, featuring popular musicals such as "Chicago", "Singin' in the Rain" and "Les Misérables"; regular music concerts; as well as yearly sell-out sixth form productions, such as "Footloose, "Hairspray" and "High School Musical". All sixth form productions are fully organised by students and raise money for local charities.

In 2015 a student radio station was launched. Run by a team of students, the station broadcasts live at lunchtimes with an automated system taking over at other times.

Notable alumni

 Paul Bird, cricketer
 Lynn Buckle, author
 Chris Cox, magician
 Chris Dent, cricketer
 Richard Foord, politician
 Jerry Gill, footballer and club manager
 Alex Giltrow, rugby player
 Kirk Jones, film director
 Noah Marullo, actor
 Joel McIver, author
 Richard Ottaway, politician
 Chris Wood, golfer

Head Teachers
 William Cox (1954-1970) 
 Barbara Sellars (1970-1988)
 Richard Nosowski OBE (1988-2002)
 Roger Mason (2002-2006)
 Julian Baldwin (2006–2016)
 Jon Nunes (2016-)

References

External links
 
 Ofsted Report Site – Backwell School

Academies in North Somerset
Educational institutions established in 1954
1954 establishments in England
Secondary schools in North Somerset